The United Kingdom Mathematics Trust (UKMT) is a charity founded in 1996 to help with the education of children in mathematics within the UK.

History
The national mathematics competitions existed prior to the formation of the UKMT, but the foundation of the UKMT in the summer of 1996 enabled them to be run collectively. The Senior Mathematical Challenge was formerly the National Mathematics Contest. Founded in 1961, it was run by the Mathematical Association from 1975 until its adoption by the UKMT in 1996. The Junior and Intermediate Mathematical Challenges were the initiative of Dr Tony Gardiner in 1987 and were run by him under the name of the United Kingdom Mathematics Foundation until 1996. The popularity of the UK national mathematics competitions is largely due to the publicising efforts of Dr Gardiner in the years 1987-1995. Hence, in 1995, he advertised for the formation of a committee and for a host institution that would lead to the establishment of the UKMT, enabling the challenges to be run effectively together under one organisation.

Mathematical Challenges
The UKMT runs a series of mathematics challenges to encourage childs interest in mathematics and develop their skills in secondary schools. The three main challenges are:
 Junior Mathematical Challenge (UK year 8/S2 and below)
 Intermediate Mathematical Challenge (UK year 11/S4 and below)
 Senior Mathematical Challenge (UK year 13/S6 and below)

Certificates
In the Junior and Intermediate Challenges the top scoring 50% of the entrants receive bronze, silver or gold certificates based on their mark in the paper. In the Senior Mathematical Challenge these certificates are awarded to top scoring 66% of the entries. In each case bronze, silver and gold certificates are awarded in the ratio 3 : 2 : 1.
So in the Junior and Intermediate Challenges
 The Gold award is achieved by the top 8-9% of the entrants.
 The Silver award is achieved by 16-17% of the entrants.
 The Bronze award is achieved by 25% of the entrants.

In the past, only the top 40% of participants received a certificate in the Junior and Intermediate Challenges, and only the top 60% of participants received a certificate in the Senior Challenge. The ratio of bronze, silver, and gold have not changed, still being 3 : 2 : 1.

Junior Mathematical Challenge
The Junior Mathematical Challenge (JMC) is an introductory challenge for pupils in Years 8 or below (aged 13) or below, taking place in spring each year. This takes the form of twenty-five multiple choice questions to be sat in exam conditions, to be completed within one hour. The first fifteen questions are designed to be easier, and a pupil will gain 5 marks for getting a question in this section correct. Questions 16-20 are more difficult and are worth 6 marks, with a penalty of 1 point for a wrong answer which tries to stop pupils guessing. The last five questions are intended to be the most challenging and so are also 6 marks, but with a 2 point penalty for an incorrectly answered question. Questions to which no answer is entered will gain (and lose) 0 marks. However, in recent years there has been no negative marking so wrong questions will be given 0 marks. Previously, the top 40% of students (50% since the 2022 JMC) get a certificate of varying levels (Gold, Silver or Bronze) based on their score.

Junior Kangaroo 
Over 10,000 participants from the JMC are invited to participate in the Junior Kangaroo. Most of the Junior Kangaroo participants are those who performed well in the JMC, however the Junior Kangaroo is open to discretionary entries for a fee. Similar to the JMC, the Junior Kangaroo is a 60 minute challenge consisting of 25 multiple-choice problems. Correct answers for Questions 1-15 earn 5 marks, and for Questions 16-25 earn 6 marks. Blank or incorrect answers are marked 0; there is no penalty for wrong answers.

The top 25% of participants in the Junior Kangaroo receive a Certificate of Merit.

Junior Mathematical Olympiad
The highest 1200 scorers are also invited to take part in the Junior Mathematical Olympiad (JMO). Like the JMC, the JMO is sat in schools. This is also divided into two sections. Part A is composed of 10 questions in which the candidate gives just the answer (not multiple choice), worth 10 marks (1 mark each). Part B consists of 6 questions and encourages students to write out full solutions. Each question in section B is worth 10 marks and students are encouraged to write complete answers to 2-4 questions rather than hurry through incomplete answers to all 6. If the solution is judged to be incomplete, it is marked on a 0+ basis, maximum 3 marks. If it has an evident logical strategy, it is marked on a 10- basis. The total mark for the whole paper is 70. Everyone who participates in this challenge will gain a certificate (Participation 75%, Distinction 25%); the top 200 or so gaining medals (Gold, Silver, Bronze); with the top fifty winning a book prize.

Intermediate Mathematical Challenge
The Intermediate Mathematical Challenge (IMC) is aimed at school years equivalent to English Years 9-11, taking place in winter each year. Following the same structure as the JMC, this paper presents the student with twenty-five multiple choice questions to be done under exam conditions in one hour.  The first fifteen questions are designed to be easier, and a pupil will gain 5 marks for getting a question in this section correct. Questions 16-20 are more difficult and are worth 6 marks, with a penalty of 1 point for a wrong answer which tries to stop pupils guessing. The last five questions are intended to be the most challenging and so are also 6 marks, but with a 2 point penalty for an incorrectly answered question. Questions to which no answer is entered will gain (and lose) 0 marks.

Again, the top 40% of students taking this challenge get a certificate. There are two follow-on rounds to this competition: The European Kangaroo and the Intermediate Mathematical Olympiad. Additionally, top performers can be selected for the National Mathematics Summer Schools.

Intermediate Mathematical Olympiad
To prevent this getting confused with the International Mathematical Olympiad, this is often abbreviated to the IMOK Olympiad (IMOK = Intermediate Mathematical Olympiad and Kangaroo).

The IMOK is sat by the top 500 scorers from each school year in the Intermediate Maths Challenge and consists of three papers, 'Cayley', 'Hamilton' and 'Maclaurin' named after famous mathematicians. The paper the student will undertake depends on the year group that student is in (Cayley for those in year 9 and below, Hamilton for year 10 and Maclaurin for year 11).

Each paper contains six questions. Each solution is marked out of 10 on a 0+ and 10- scale; that is to say, if an answer is judged incomplete or unfinished, it is awarded a few marks for progress and relevant observations, whereas if it is presented as complete and correct, marks are deducted for faults, poor reasoning, or unproven assumptions. As a result, it is quite uncommon for an answer to score a middling mark (e.g. 4–6). This makes the maximum mark out of 60. For a student to get two questions fully correct is considered "very good". All people taking part in this challenge will get a certificate (participation for the bottom 50%, merit for the next 25% and distinction for the top 25%). The mark boundaries for these certificates change every year, but normally around 30 marks will gain a Distinction. Those scoring highly (the top 50) will gain a book prize; again, this changes every year, with 44 marks required in the Maclaurin paper in 2006. Also, the top 100 candidates will receive a medal; bronze for Cayley, silver for Hamilton and gold for Maclaurin.

European Kangaroo

The European Kangaroo is a competition which follows the same structure as the AMC (Australian Mathematics Competition). There are twenty-five multiple-choice questions and no penalty marking. This paper is taken throughout Europe by over 3 million pupils from more than 37 countries. Two different Kangaroo papers follow on from the Intermediate Maths Challenge and the next 5500 highest scorers below the Olympiad threshold are invited to take part (both papers are by invitation only). The Grey Kangaroo is sat by students in year 9 and below and the Pink Kangaroo is sat by those in years 10 and 11. The top 25% of scorers in each paper receive a certificate of merit and the rest receive a certificate of participation. All those who sit either Kangaroo also receive a keyfob containing a different mathematical puzzle each year. (The puzzles along with solutions)

National Mathematics Summer Schools

Selected by lottery, 48 of the top 1.5% of scorers in the IMC are invited to participate in one of three week-long National Mathematics Summer Schools in July. Each from a different school across the UK, the 24 boys and 24 girls are facilitated with a range of activities, including daily lectures, designed to go beyond the GCSE syllabus and explore wider and more challenging areas of mathematics. The UKMT aims to "promote mathematical thinking" and "provide an opportunity for participants to meet other students and adults who enjoy mathematics". They were delivered virtually during the COVID-19 pandemic but had reverted to in-person events by 2022.

Senior Mathematical Challenge

The Senior Mathematical Challenge (SMC) takes place in late-autumn each year, and is open to students who are aged 19 or below and are not registered to attend a university. SMC consists of twenty-five multiple choice questions to be answered in 90 minutes. All candidates start with 25 marks, each correct answer is awarded 4 marks and 1 mark is deducted for each incorrect answer. This gives a score between 0 and 125 marks.

Unlike the JMC and IMC, the top 66% get one of the three certificates. Further, the top 1000 highest scorers who are eligible to represent the UK at the International Mathematical Olympiad, together with any discretionary and international candidates, are invited to compete in the British Mathematical Olympiad and the next around 6000 highest scorers are invited to sit the Senior Kangaroo. Discretionary candidates are those students who are entered by their mathematics teachers, on payment of a fee, who did not score quite well enough in the SMC, but who might cope well in the next round.

British Mathematical Olympiad

Round 1 of the Olympiad is a three-and-a-half hour examination including six more difficult, long answer questions, which serve to test entrants' problem-solving skills. As of 2005, a more accessible first question was added to the paper; before this, it only consisted of 5 questions. Around 100 highest scoring candidates from BMO1 are invited to sit the BMO2, which is the follow-up round that has the same time limit as BMO1, but in which 4 harder questions are posed. The top 24 scoring students from the second round are subsequently invited to a training camp at Trinity College, Cambridge for the first stage of the International Mathematical Olympiad UK team selection.

Senior Kangaroo
The Senior Kangaroo is a one-hour examination to which the next around 6000 highest scorers below the Olympiad threshold are invited. The paper consists of twenty questions, each of which require three digit answers (leading zeros are used if the answer is less than 100, since the paper is marked by machine). The top 25% of candidates receive a certificate of merit and the rest receive a certificate of participation.

Team Challenge
The UKMT Team Maths Challenge is an annual event. One team from each participating school, comprising four pupils selected from year 8 and 9 (ages 12–14), competes in a regional round. No more than 2 pupils on a team may be from Year 9. There are over 60 regional competitions in the UK, held between February and May. The winning team in each regional round, as well as a few high-scoring runners-up from throughout the country, are then invited to the National Final in London, usually in late June.

There are 4 rounds: 
 Group Questions
 Cross-Numbers
 Shuttle (NB: The previous Head-to-Head Round has been replaced with another, similar to the Mini-Relay used in the 2007 and 2008 National Finals.)
 Relay

In the National Final however an additional 'Poster Round' is added at the beginning. The poster round is a separate competition, however, since 2018 it is worth up to six marks towards the main event.  Four schools have won the Junior Maths Team competition at least twice: Queen Mary's Grammar School in Walsall, City of London School, St Olave's Grammar School, and Westminster Under School.

Senior Team Challenge

A pilot event for a competition similar to the Team Challenge, aimed at 16- to 18-year-olds, was launched in the Autumn of 2007 and has been running ever since. The format is much the same, with a limit of two year 13 (Upper Sixth-Form) pupils per team. Regional finals take place between October and December, with the National Final in early February the following year.

Previous winners are below:

British Mathematical Olympiad Subtrust
For more information see British Mathematical Olympiad Subtrust.

The British Mathematical Olympiad Subtrust is run by UKMT, which runs the British Mathematical Olympiad as well as the UK Mathematical Olympiad for Girls, several training camps throughout the year such as a winter camp in Hungary, an Easter camp at Trinity College, Cambridge, and other training and selection of the IMO team.

See also
 European Kangaroo
 British Mathematical Olympiad
 International Mathematical Olympiad
 International Mathematics Competition for University Students

References

External links
 United Kingdom Mathematics Trust website
 British Mathematical Olympiad Committee site
 International Mathematics Competition for University Students (IMC) site
 Junior Mathematical Challenge Sample Paper
 Intermediate Mathematical Challenge Sample Paper
 Senior Mathematical Challenge Sample Paper

1996 establishments in the United Kingdom
Competitions in the United Kingdom
Mathematics competitions
Mathematics education in the United Kingdom